Matthias Numsen Blytt (26 April 1789 – 26 June 1862) was a Norwegian botanist. He was born at Overhalla in Nord-Trøndelag, Norway. He attended the University of Christiania (now University of Oslo) and the University of Copenhagen. Blytt was professor of botany at the  University of Oslo.

References

1789 births
1862 deaths
People from Overhalla
Academic staff of the University of Oslo
19th-century Norwegian botanists
Burials at the Cemetery of Our Saviour